The Armenian Catholicosate of the Great House of Cilicia is an autocephalous Oriental Orthodox church. Since 1930, the Catholicosate of the Great House of Cilicia has been headquartered in Antelias, Lebanon. Aram I is the Catholicos of Cilicia since 1995.

Great House of Cilicia eras

First Sis era, 267-301: According to the order of Catholicoi, *St. Gregory I the Enlightener (also known as Gregory the Illuminator) was seated in Sis 267-301 before moving to Etchmiadzin in 301 where he continued in office until 325. 
In 485 AD, the Catholicosate was transferred to the new capital of Armenia Dvin. In the 10th century it moved from Dvin to Dzoravank and then to Aghtamar (927 AD), to Arghina (947 AD) and to Ani (992 AD)
Sivas era, 1058–1062
Tavbloor era, 1062–1066
Dzamendav (Zamidia, now Zamantı) era, 1066–1116
Dzovk (Present aka Island of Gölcük and under the lake of Hazar), era, 1116–1149
Hromgla (now Halfeti) era, 1149–1293
Second Sis era, 1293-1930 (with the Catholicosate of All Armenians returned to Etchmiadzin in 1441) 
Antelias, Lebanon era, since 1930 - having transferred there from Sis in Cilicia in the aftermath of the Armenian genocide.

Early history of the Armenian Church
The origin of the Armenian Church dates back to the Apostolic age and according to the ancient tradition was established by St. Thaddeus and St. Bartholomew. In 301 AD, Christianity was officially accepted by the Armenians as the state religion.

Early era of the Catholicosate in Cilicia (1058–1293)

Two Catholicosates starting in 1441 AD
In 1441, a new Catholicos of All Armenians was elected in Holy Etchmiadzin in the person of Kirakos I Virapetsi of Armenia. At the same time the retiring Catholicos in Sis Gregory IX Mousabegian (1439–1446) remained as the Catholicos of the Great House of Cilicia. Therefore, since 1441, there have been two Catholicosates in the Armenian Apostolic Church. The Catholicos of All Armenians resides in the Mother See of Holy Etchmiadzin.

Catholicosate in Sis (1293–1930)
The city of Sis (modern-day Kozan, Adana, Turkey) was the center of the Catholicosate of the Great House of Cilicia for more than six centuries, starting in 1293 when the Catholicosate moved from Hromgla to Sis. The monastery of St. Sophia of Sis, home of the Catholicosate, dominates the town in early 20th-century photographs.
During the Armenian genocide, in 1915, the Armenian population in Cilicia was mostly destroyed.

Catholicosate in Antelias, Lebanon (1930–present)

In 1922 the American Committee for Relief in the Near East established an orphanage in Antilias for survivors of the genocide. It continued operating until 1928. After the foundation's Executive Committee was petitioned in 1929 by Sahak II, in 1930 the now-vacant buildings of the orphanage were leased to the Cilicia Catholicosate for a period of five years to be used as a seat for the Catholicosate and a seminary for training priests and teachers. The foundation also agreed to contribute $6000-$7000 yearly towards running costs.

Publications

Hask

The Catholicossate has its own publishing house and has a number of publications, most notably the monthly "Hask" (in Armenian Հասկ), the official organ of the Holy See of Cilicia.

Others
The Catholicosate also publishes a great number of books in Armenian and other languages, mainly on church literature as well as Armenian historical, cultural and literary subjects and series/collections of important Armenian literature.

The Catholicosate of the Great House of Cilicia also organizes an annual book fair on the occasion of Feast of the Holy Translators (known also as Surb Tarkmantchats), an official holiday on the calendar of the Armenian Apostolic Church to commemorate the legacy of the translators of the Bible and other Christian religious books to Armenian language in the 5th century.

Hask Armenological Review

It also publishes the annual "Hask Armenological Review" (in Armenian Հասկ Հայագիտական Հանդէս) on Armenian studies

Prelacies and Dioceses, and Churches
(in parenthesis, the residence of the Prelate / Archbishop / Bishop)

Canada
 Armenian Prelacy of Canada

United States of America
 Armenian Prelacy of the Eastern United States
 Armenian Prelacy of the Western United States

Ontario
St. Mary Armenian Apostolic Church, Toronto, Ontario

Lebanon
Armenian Diocese of Lebanon, in Beirut
Syria
Armenian Diocese of Beroea, in Aleppo
Cyprus
Armenian Diocese of Cyprus, in Nicosia
Nicosia
Sourp Asdvadzadzin church (1981).
Old Sourp Asdvadzadzin church (1308), as of 1964 under Turkish occupation.
Sourp Boghos chapel (1892).
Sourp Haroutiun chapel (1938).
Sourp Amenapergitch chapel (1995).
Famagusta
Ganchvor church (1346), as of 1964 under Turkish occupation.
Larnaca
Sourp Stepanos church (1909).
Limassol
Sourp Kevork church (1939).

Iran
Armenian Diocese of Isfahan, in New Julfa
Armenian Diocese of Atrpatakan, in Tabriz

Gallery

See also
Armenian Apostolic Church
Mother See of Holy Etchmiadzin
List of Armenian Catholicoi of Cilicia

References

Sources

External links
 Official site of the Armenian Catholicosate of Cilicia

Cilicia
Armenian Kingdom of Cilicia